Rødøya is an island in the municipality of Rødøy in Nordland county, Norway.  The  island is located just west of the mouth of the Tjongsfjorden, north of the island of Gjerdøya, and west of the mainland.  There are ferry connections from the village of Rødøy to the village of Jektvika on the mainland and to the nearby island of Gjerdøya.  Rødøy Church is located in the village of Rødøy on the south side of the island.  The island had 150 residents in 2017.

See also 
 List of islands of Norway

References 

Islands of Nordland
Rødøy